During the 2002–03 season, Middlesbrough participated in the FA Premier League.

Kit 
Middlesbrough had a new sponsor, Dial-a-Phone, for the 2002–03 season. The team's kit was produced by Errea. The home shirt consisted of a plain red shirt, red shorts and red socks with white trim. The away strip consisted of white shirts with black piping, plain white shorts and white socks with navy blue trim.

Season review
Despite losing the new £6 million signing of the returning Juninho, Boro made a promising start to the 2002–03 season, peaking at third in early October. The signings of Maccarone and Boateng, along with the loan of Geremi, gave the fans real hope of a top-six finish. However, following a fantastic 3–0 win away at Spurs at the end of September which sent the club 3rd, Middlesbrough seemed to press the self-destruct button, losing the next 8 games away from home without scoring; although they remained undefeated in this period at home, this saw them sink to 12th position. This persuaded Steve McClaren to make changes, and during the January transfer window he brought in Chris Riggott and Malcolm Christie from Derby County, Michael Ricketts from Bolton Wanderers and Doriva on loan from Celta Vigo. This, coupled with the return of the now-fit Juninho, stopped the bad run of form and the results picked up a bit. Middlesbrough hovered around 14th for a few weeks before finishing 11th. Again, the season was regarded as a disappointment after the promising start.

Both cups were also a disappointment for Boro. They went out of the FA Cup in the third round, losing 1–0 at Chelsea. They fared slightly better in the League Cup, beating Brentford 4–1 in the second round but then losing to lower league opposition in the form of Ipswich Town, 3–1 away.

Final league table

First-team squad

|}

Discipline

Disciplinary records for 2002–03 league and cup matches. Players with 1 card or more included only.

Transfers

In

Out

Results

Premier League

Note: Results are given with Middlesbrough score listed first. Man of the Match is according to mfc.co.uk.

League Cup

FA Cup

Statistics

Goalscorers
Goalscoring statistics for 2002-03.

Appearances and discipline
Appearance and disciplinary records for 2002-03 league and cup matches.

References and notes

Middlesbrough F.C. seasons
Middlesbrough